Hesperantha is a genus of cormous flowering plants in the family Iridaceae. The genus name is derived from the Greek words hesperos, meaning "evening", and anthos, meaning "flower".

There are approximately 79 species, mostly native to southern Africa, but with four species reaching tropical Africa. All except one grow from corms.

The synonym Schizostylis is widely used in British horticulture for the single rhizomatous species S. coccinea, widely cultivated as a garden flower, and with numerous cultivars. Common names include scarlet river lily and crimson flag.

Species

See also
 List of plants known as lily

References

Iridaceae genera
Flora of Africa
Iridaceae